Los Cancajos is a small tourist resort in the Canarian island of La Palma. Its resident population is 713 (2013). It is located in the municipality of Breña Baja on the east coast of La Palma, between the island capital, Santa Cruz de La Palma, and La Palma Airport.

History
The area used to be dominated by salt pans, which fell into disuse, leaving a large, flat area, and was designated for a tourist resort in the 1980s.

Tourism
Los Cancajos has several small beaches of black sand, protected by artificial breakwaters, with some rocky coves and headlands, and a palm-tree lined promenade along the shore. As of 2013, there were 3,724 beds in hotels and tourist apartments in the municipality of Breña Baja (most of which are situated in Los Cancajos), making up about one third of all accommodation on the island.

Climate

Los Cancajos has a hot semi-arid climate which is heavily influenced by the Atlantic Ocean. The following climate chart is from the La Palma Airport, located 2 km south of Los Cancajos:

References

Populated places in La Palma
Beaches of the Canary Islands